The Waldron Commercial Historic District encompasses the historic central business district of Waldron, Arkansas.  This area, a five-block stretch of Main Street (extended to Washington Street to include the old Scott County Courthouse), was primarily developed between 1880 and 1920, but was an active commercial area from the town's incorporation in 1852.  An unknown number of its early buildings were destroyed during the American Civil War.  Most of the buildings are one and two story brick structures, with a variety of commercial architectural and vernacular styles present.  The courthouse is a notable late building: it was built in 1933, and has Art Deco styling.

The district was listed on the National Register of Historic Places in 2008.

See also
National Register of Historic Places listings in Scott County, Arkansas

References

Historic districts on the National Register of Historic Places in Arkansas
Italianate architecture in Arkansas
Buildings and structures completed in 1880
Scott County, Arkansas
National Register of Historic Places in Scott County, Arkansas